The following is the list of squads for each of the 16 teams competing in the 2018 FIBA Women's Basketball World Cup, to be held in Spain between September 22–30. Each team will select a squad of 12 players for the tournament.

Group A

Canada

France

Greece

South Korea

Group B

Argentina

Australia

Nigeria

Turkey

Group C

Belgium

Japan

Puerto Rico

Spain

Group D

China

Latvia

Senegal

United States

References

Squads
FIBA Women's Basketball World Cup squads